RFA Resource was an armament stores ship of the Royal Fleet Auxiliary.

Falklands War
Resource served in the Falklands War, captained at that time by Captain Bruce Seymour. She was one of the first vessels on the scene to pick up survivors from HMS Sheffield, having just supplied her.

RFA Resource was one of several RFA munitions replenishment ships certified to store and supply the fleet with munitions, including WE.177A live nuclear weapons. This was initially RFA Regent, and when RFA Resource exited San Carlos, they were transferred to her, and then to RFA Fort Austin. After the end of the conflict they were transported back to Britain aboard RFA Fort Austin and RFA Resource. Inert practice weapons and surveillance weapons without fissionable material were also transported.

Yugoslavia
One of Resources last duties before being decommissioned was to serve as a floating munitions storage for UN and IFOR troops in the former Yugoslavia.  She spent much of the mid 1990s in Split, Croatia, fulfilling this role.

Decommissioning and scrapping
Resource sailed from Devonport on 24 June 1997, having been renamed Resourceful for the delivery run to the Indian breakers, and arrived at Alang for scrapping on 20 August 1997.

Footnotes

 Guardian Article mentioning RFA Resource - http://www.guardian.co.uk/falklands/story/0,,657867,00.html
 Images of RFA Resource and a Wessex Helicopter - http://www.john.fotoblog.org.uk/p14552235.html
 Images and information about RFA Resource and sister ship Regent - https://web.archive.org/web/20061212183624/http://www.btinternet.com/~warship/Feature/rfa/pics2.htm
 Hansard entry mentioning final fate of RFA Resource - https://publications.parliament.uk/pa/cm200203/cmhansrd/vo030227/text/30227w04.htm
 Falklands day by day from Royal Navy - http://www.navynews.co.uk/falklands/day_april.asp 

Stores ships of the Royal Fleet Auxiliary
1966 ships
Falklands War naval ships of the United Kingdom